Estela Riley (born 14 July 1969) is a Panamanian judoka. She competed in the women's heavyweight event at the 2000 Summer Olympics.

References

1969 births
Living people
Panamanian female judoka
Olympic judoka of Panama
Judoka at the 2000 Summer Olympics
Place of birth missing (living people)